Hu Mingfei (born 24 February 1993, in Zhenjiang) is a Chinese footballer who currently plays for Suzhou Dongwu in the China League One.

Club career
Hu Mingfei started his professional football career in 2011 when he joined Jiangsu Youth for the 2011 China League Two campaign. Failing to join Jiangsu Sainty, he moved to another Chinese Super League club Shanghai Shenxin in January 2014 after impressing on trial. Hu was promoted to Shanghai Shenxin first team squad in 2015. On 11 April 2015, he made his Super League debut in a 2–1 away defeat against Shijiazhuang Ever Bright, coming on as a substitute for Chi Zhongguo in the 91st minute. He was sent to the Shenxin reserved team in 2018.

On 21 February 2019, Hu transferred to League Two side Suzhou Dongwu.

Career statistics 
Statistics accurate as of match played 31 December 2020.

References

External links
 

1993 births
Living people
Chinese footballers
Footballers from Jiangsu
Shanghai Shenxin F.C. players
Suzhou Dongwu F.C. players
Chinese Super League players
China League One players
China League Two players
People from Zhenjiang
Association football defenders